Tazehabad (also Romanized as Tāzehābād) is a village in Kashkan Rural District, Shahivand District, Dowreh County, Lorestan Province, Iran.

Population

At the 2006 census, its population was 43, in 8 families.

References 

Towns and villages in Dowreh County